= Classical English =

Classical English may refer to:

- Old English, language of the Anglo-Saxons, form of English until mid-12th century
- Middle English, stage of the English language from mid-12th century to around the turn of the 16th century
- Early Modern English, stage of Modern English before the 18th century
